Loins of Punjab Presents is a 2007 Indian film directed by Manish Acharya. It stars Shabana Azmi, Ayesha Dharker and Ajay Naidu.  The film marked Acharya's feature directorial debut.

Plot
A New Jersey town catches Bollywood fever when five Indian-Americans and one Jewish Indophile compete in an amateur Indian Idol-style singing contest. Loins of Punjab Presents satirizes non-resident Indians and Bollywood fans as they vie for the title of "Desi Idol."

Cast
Shabana Azmi as Rrita Kapoor
Ayesha Dharker as Opama Menon
Ajay Naidu .as .. Turbanotorious B.D.G.
Manish Acharya as Vikram Jaiswal
Jameel Khan as Mr. Amit Bokade
Darshan Jariwala as Sanjeev Patel
Loveleen Mishra as Alpa Patel
Ishita Sharma as Preeti Patel
Kunaal Roy Kapur as Raghav White
Michael Raimondi as Josh Cohen
Samrat Chakrabarti as Trance Sen
Alexx ONell as Wesminton
Seema Rahmani as Sanya Rehman
 Yusuf Hussain as Mr. Faiz Rehman

Music
"Dhol Beat" - Ajay Naidu, Samrat Chakrabarti
"Dhol Beat (DJ Suketu feat. Aks remix)" - Ajay Naidu, Samrat Chakrabarti

References

External links 
Loins of Punjab Presents - Official Website of the film  

2007 films
English-language Indian films
Films scored by Anu Malik
Films about Indian Americans
2007 directorial debut films
2000s English-language films